Haplogroup C1b2 may refer to subclades of:

 Haplogroup C-F3393 (Y-DNA), also known as C1, which includes the subclade
 Haplogroup C-B477 or C1b2 which is common among Oceanian males, or;
 Haplogroup C (mtDNA)